A salt glacier (or namakier) is a rare flow of salt that is created when a rising diapir in a salt dome breaches the surface of the Earth. The name ‘salt glacier’ was given to this phenomenon due to the similarity of movement when compared with ice glaciers. The causes of these formations is primarily due to salt's unique properties and its surrounding geologic environment. A rising body of salt is referred to as a diapir; which rises to the surface and feeds the salt glacier. Salt structures are usually composed of halite, anhydrite, gypsum and clay minerals. Clays may be brought up with the salt, turning it dark. These salt flows are rare on earth. In a more recent discovery, scientists have found that they also occur on Mars, but are composed of sulfates.

The salt glaciers of the Zagros Mountains in Iran are halite whereas the salt glacier of Lüneburg Kalkberg, Germany is composed of gypsum and carbonate minerals.

Ancient flows have been preserved in various rock records by sedimentation. Late Triassic salt glaciers repeatedly flowed onto a basin in Germany and were buried with sediment to create a series of preserved glaciers. Miocene glaciers flowed into sheets in the northern Gulf of Mexico and were similarly preserved by overriding sediment.

Formation and causes 

The sources of salt glaciers are salt deposits. Over time sediments, rock and debris cover the deposit causing layers to build up over the salt. Due to its crystalline structure, salt remains at the same density while the sediment above begins to compress and become denser. The density contrast is the mechanism in which salt begins to rise. Diapirs rise and pierce the surface allowing the salt to flow because of gravity. Piercing the overburden is crucial for salt glaciers to form, and can occur in three ways. Active diapirism develops as the rising salt itself pushes and forces the overburden upward and sideways. Passive diapirism occurs when the salt always remains near the surface and the sediment builds up around it rather than over it. Reactive diapirism is the result of regional extension caused by rifting. The overburden becomes weak and thin which allows the salt body to travel upwards.

Salt glaciers are a frequent topic in salt tectonics, which is the study of salt causing deformation and its leading cause is differential loading (an unevenly distributed load). Differential loading can be caused by displacement, gravitational and thermal gradients. Other tectonics may cause salt deposit uplift. The strength of the overburden and drag of the salt deposit boundary are the two factors that will slow and prevent salt flow and it will only move if the salt forces exceed the resistant forces.

Structure and movement 

The structure of a salt glacier is much like that of an ice glacier. Salt glaciers on average may only advance a few meters per year.  Salt will continue to flow on the surface if sedimentation, erosion and disintegration rates are slow and thus will have little impact. Salt glaciers move faster as precipitation increases; however too much precipitation may dissolve the salt.  Salt glaciers may also leave behind features such as moraines.

Geography 

Salt glaciers are mostly found in arid areas, where they will be preserved due to the dry climatic conditions. Southern Iran hosts the majority of salt glaciers and the most active salt glacier in the world. The Kuh-e-Namak salt glacier is located in southeast Iran.  This salt feature is composed of two salt glaciers and the larger one is 50–100 m thick and 3,000 m long. The summit of the feature is around 1,600 m above sea level.

Significance 

Salt glaciers provide observable and tangible evidence demonstrating salt movement which allows scientists to further understand movement that occurs beneath the Earth's surface. New studies of salt glaciers can help improve the understanding how salt tectonics work and how they influence the surrounding landscape. Salt structures often have petroleum traps, which contain much of the oil in use today. The traps are also being studied to serve as potential storage vessels for waste and fuels.

See also
 Salt surface structures

References

 

Sediments
Salt domes